Kalotermes is a genus of 'drywood termites' belonging to the family Kalotermitidae, one of the most primitive families of termites.

List of species
 Kalotermes aemulus Sewell & Gay, 1978
 Kalotermes atratus (Hill, 1933)
 Kalotermes banksiae (Hill, 1942)
 Kalotermes convexus (Walker, 1853)
 Kalotermes flavicollis (Fabricius, 1793)
 Kalotermes hermsi Kirby, 1926
 Kalotermes hilli Emerson in Snyder, 1949
 Kalotermes jepsoni Kemner, 1932
 Kalotermes pallidinotum (Hill, 1942)
 Kalotermes rufinotum (Hill, 1925)
 Kalotermes serrulatus Gay, 1977

References

 Biolib
 Fauna Europaea

Termite genera